Cudgegong River, a perennial stream that is part of the Macquarie catchment within the Murray–Darling basin, is located in the central western and Orana districts of New South Wales, Australia.

The river rises of the western slopes of the Great Dividing Range within Wollemi National Park, east of Rylstone, and flows generally west, north-west, and south-west, joined by fourteen tributaries, including Wyaldra Creek and Lawsons Creek, before reaching its confluence with the Macquarie River at Lake Burrendong; descending  over its  course.

Several reservoirs, including Rylstone Reservoir and Lake Windamere, impede the natural flow of the Cudgegong River past the towns of Mudgee, and near Gulgong.

References

External links
 

Rivers of New South Wales
Murray-Darling basin